Environment statistics is the application of statistical methods to environmental science. It covers procedures for dealing with questions concerning the natural environment in its undisturbed state, the interaction of humanity with the environment, and urban environments. The field of environmental statistics has seen rapid growth in the past few decades as a response to increasing concern over the environment in the public, organizational, and governmental sectors.

The United Nations' Framework for the Development of Environment Statistics (FDES) defines the scope of environment statistics as follows:
The scope of environment statistics covers biophysical aspects of the environment and those aspects of the socio-economic system that directly influence and interact with the environment.
The scope of environment, social and economic statistics overlap. It is not easy – or necessary – to draw a clear line dividing these areas. Social and economic statistics that describe processes or activities with a direct impact on, or direct interaction with, the environment are used widely in environment statistics. They are within the scope of the FDES.

Uses
Statistical analysis is essential to the field of environmental sciences, allowing researchers to gain an understanding of environmental issues through researching and developing potential solutions to the issues they study. The applications of statistical methods to environmental sciences are numerous and varied. Environmental statistics are used in many fields including; health and safety organizations, standard bodies, research institutes, water and river authorities, meteorological organizations, fisheries, protection agencies, and in risk, pollution, regulation and control concerns.

Environmental statistics is especially pertinent and widely used in the academic, governmental, regulatory, technological, and consulting industries.

Specific applications of statistical analysis within the field of environmental science include earthquake risk analysis, environmental policymaking, ecological sampling planning, environmental forensics.

Within the scope of environmental statistics, there are two main categories of their uses.

 Descriptive statistics is not used to make inferences about data, but simply to describe its characteristics.
 Inferential statistics is used to make inferences about data, test hypotheses or make predictions.

Types of studies covered in environmental statistics include:

 Baseline studies to document the present state of an environment to provide background in case of unknown changes in the future;
 Targeted studies to describe the likely impact of changes being planned or of accidental occurrences;
 Regular monitoring to attempt to detect changes in the environment.

Sources
Sources of data for environmental statistics are varied and include surveys related to human populations and the environment, records from agencies managing environmental resources, maps and images, equipment used to examine the environment, and research studies around the world. A primary component of the data is direct observation, although most environmental statistics use a variety of sources.

Methods
Methods of statistical analysis in environmental sciences are as numerous as its applications. While there is a basis for the methods used in other fields, many of these methods must be adapted to suit the needs or limitations of data in environmental science. Linear regression models, generalized linear models, and non-linear models are some methods of statistical analysis that are widely used within environmental science to study relationships between variables.

See also
Coordination of Information on the Environment
Environmental studies
Statistics

References

External links
https://www.oecd-ilibrary.org/environment/data/oecd-environment-statistics_env-data-en
https://unstats.un.org/unsd/envstats/qindicators.cshtml
http://www.jenvstat.org/
https://cfpub.epa.gov/si/si_public_record_report.cfm?dirEntryId=137230&Lab=NERL
https://web.ma.utexas.edu/users/mks/envstat.html
https://www.umass.edu/landeco/teaching/ecodata/schedule/statistics.pdf
https://unstats.un.org/unsd/environmentgl/default.asp

 
Applied statistics